Manoel da Rocha Villar (21 November 1912 – 9 October 2011) was an Olympic freestyle swimmer from Brazil, who participated at two Summer Olympics for his native country. At the 1932 Summer Olympics in Los Angeles, he swam the 4×200-metre freestyle, finishing 7th in the final, along with Manuel Silva, Isaac Moraes and Benevenuto Nunes. He also swam the 100-metre freestyle, not reaching the finals. At the 1936 Summer Olympics in Berlin, he swam the 400-metre, 1500-metre, and 4×200-metre freestyle, not reaching the finals.

References

1912 births
2011 deaths
Brazilian male freestyle swimmers
Olympic swimmers of Brazil
Swimmers at the 1932 Summer Olympics
Swimmers at the 1936 Summer Olympics
21st-century Brazilian people
20th-century Brazilian people